Westwood is a neighborhood in the West End Region of Pittsburgh, Pennsylvania.  Beginning as a part of the now-defunct Township of Chartiers and existing for a short time as an independent borough, Westwood was annexed by the City of Pittsburgh in three pieces: the eastern third in 1872, and the remaining sectors progressing west in 1921 and 1927. Westwood is a quiet residential community inhabited by a large variety of residents, and exhibits an eclectic mix of architectural styles that span many periods. Among these is the John Frew House, one of the oldest surviving structures west of the Allegheny Mountains, which dates (in its original form) to 1790. Westwood also contains a public primary school bearing the community's name, as well as a public swimming pool, a playground, and ballfields. The neighborhood's main thoroughfare is Noblestown Road (which splits it in two), and Noble Manor is its major commercial district. 
It has a zip codes of both 15205 (Western Half) and 15220 (Eastern Half), and has representation on Pittsburgh City Council by the council member (Theresa Kail-Smith) for District 2 (West Neighborhoods).  The Pittsburgh Bureau of Fire houses 29 Engine in Westwood.

Surrounding communities
Westwood has seven borders, five with the Pittsburgh neighborhoods of Crafton Heights to the north, Elliott to the northeast, Ridgemont and West End Valley to the east, and Oakwood to the south.  The other two borders are with the boroughs of Green Tree to the south and Crafton to the southwest.

See also
List of Pittsburgh neighborhoods

References

External links
Interactive Pittsburgh Neighborhoods Map

Neighborhoods in Pittsburgh